Stanisław Marucha (17 January 1937 – 26 September 2008) was a Polish sports shooter. He competed at the 1964 Summer Olympics and the 1976 Summer Olympics.

References

1937 births
2008 deaths
Polish male sport shooters
Olympic shooters of Poland
Shooters at the 1964 Summer Olympics
Shooters at the 1976 Summer Olympics
People from Kalisz County
Sportspeople from Greater Poland Voivodeship